What It Takes: The Way to the White House is a nonfiction book about the 1988 United States presidential election, written by Richard Ben Cramer. It was published in 1992. It follows the campaigns of Republicans George Herbert Walker Bush and Bob Dole and Democrats Joe Biden, Michael Dukakis, Dick Gephardt, and Gary Hart.

The bulk of the book covers the early lives and political careers of the candidates, their campaigns leading up to the New Hampshire primary, and the primary itself. Cramer spent six years researching and writing What It Takes.

The book is frequently cited by political aides and journalists as one of the most influential books on politics ever written.

Editorial reviews 

Cleveland Plain Dealer: "Quite possibly the finest book on presidential politics ever written, combining meticulous reporting and compelling, at times soaringly lyrical, prose."

San Francisco Chronicle: "The ultimate insider's book on presidential politics...an unparalleled source book on the 1988 candidates."

References

External links
Booknotes interview with Cramer on What It Takes, July 26, 1992

1992 non-fiction books
Books about politics of the United States
1988 United States presidential election
Books about George H. W. Bush